Ganj Kola-ye Pain (also Romanized as Ganj Kolā-ye Pā’īn; also known as Pā’īn Ganjkolāh) is a village in Sajjadrud Rural District, Bandpey-ye Sharqi District, Babol County, Mazandaran Province, Iran. At the 2006 census, its population was 854, in 199 families.

References 

Populated places in Babol County